Solugerd (also Romanized as Solūgerd; also known as Sūlgar, Sūlgerd, and Sulgird) is a village in Bizaki Rural District, Golbajar District, Chenaran County, Razavi Khorasan Province, Iran. At the 2006 census, its population was 1,110, in 271 families.

References 

Populated places in Chenaran County